The Kamloops Storm are a junior ice hockey team based in Kamloops, British Columbia, Canada. They are members of the Doug Birks Division of the Okanagan/Shuswap Conference of the Kootenay International Junior Hockey League (KIJHL). They play their home games at MacArthur Island Olympic Arena .

The Storm played in Osoyoos, British Columbia until 2006, when they were moved to Kamloops. The 2006–07 season was the first one played in Kamloops.

History
The Storm won the 2004–05 KIJHL Championship, but were eliminated by the Sicamous Eagles in the 2005–06 playoffs.

The Storm also won the Keystone Cup in 2004–05.

In the 2006–07 season the Kamloops Storm went on to capture the regular season Division banner and also the playoff division banner before losing to the Fernie Ghostriders in the League Semi Finals.

The Kamloops Storm lost in the Finals to the Fernie Ghostriders 2–4 in the KIJHL 2007–08 season.

In the 2008–09 season the Kamloops Storm went to the KIJHL playoff finals, but lost to the Nelson Leafs 0–4.

The Kamloops Storm  battled to the KIJHL playoff finals again for the 2013–14 season only to drop the series to the Beaver Valley Nitehawks 2–4.

Season-by-season record
Note: GP = Games played, W = Wins, L = Losses, T = Ties, OTL = Overtime Losses, D = Defaults, Pts = Points, GF = Goals for, GA = Goals against

Records as of March 3, 2023.

Playoffs

NHL alumni
Chuck Kobasew

Awards and trophies

Most Valuable Player
Anthony Manfredi: 2007–2008
Anthony Manfredi: 2006–2007
Jeff Taylor: 2005–2006
Kyle Thompson: 2004–2005

Top Goaltender
Anthony Manfredi: 2007–2008
Anthony Manfredi: 2006–2007
Ray Nunes: 2004–2005

Top Scorer
Jassi Sangha: 2007–2008
Jassi Sangha: 2006–2007
Jeff Taylor: 2005–2006
Kyle Thompson: 2004–2005

Top Rookie
Keaton Gordon: 2014–2015

Most Sportsmanlike
Lundy Trenaman: 2006–2007

Coach of the year
Jim Liebel: 2004–2005

References

External links
Official website of the Kamloops Storm
Official YouTube Channel

Ice hockey teams in British Columbia
Sport in Kamloops
1996 establishments in British Columbia
Ice hockey clubs established in 1996